Northern Expressway, also known as the Fatchen Northern Expressway, is a 21 kilometre long controlled-access highway in Adelaide, South Australia. Since March 2020, the North–South Motorway continues west of Port Wakefield Highway and intersects the Port River Expressway to reach the harbour at Port Adelaide. These are the northernmost two parts of the North–South Corridor.

Cycling is not permitted on the Expressway. The Stuart O'Grady Bikeway is a sealed shared cycling and walking path adjacent to the eastern side of the expressway. The northern end connects to the on-ramp from Two Wells Road to the Gawler Bypass Road, and the southern end is adjacent to Port Wakefield Road at Mill Road.

Route
Northern Expressway starts at the grade-separated interchange with the Sturt Highway in Gawler. It heads southwest, just beyond the northern fringes of suburban Adelaide, to the Port Wakefield Highway at Waterloo Corner. The road has been built to a four-lane standard and provides a faster route between northern Adelaide and Gawler, relieving pressure mostly from Main North Road and other roads through Adelaide's northeastern suburbs. It allows freight vehicles to avoid residential areas and go straight to Port Wakefield Road.

History
The largest road project undertaken in South Australia in at least sixty years, the expressway was delivered at a cost of approximately  jointly funded by the South Australian and Commonwealth Governments. The Design and Construct contract was awarded to the Fulton Hogan York Joint Venture, a partnership between trans-Tasman contractor Fulton Hogan and South Australian based York Civil.

The design joint venture, managed by Fulton Hogan York Joint Venture, consisted of Maunsell, SMEC and Dare Sutton Clark. The work included an 8 km upgrade of the existing Port Wakefield Road. Part of the cost was covered by the AusLink national transport funding.

Construction began in 2008. The road opened in September 2010.

The interchanges/bridges along the expressway were all named after famous battles in which Australian forces fought, such as Long Tan, Kokoda, Tobruk, Kapyong and Hamel.

In November 2013, one year after the death of prominent South Australian author and journalist Max Fatchen, the Northern Expressway was given the dual name "Fatchen Northern Expressway" in his honour.

In December 2019, a bushfire started on the Northern Expressway at Angle Vale. This affected people in Hillier, Munno Para Downs, Kudla, Munno Para West and Gawler.

In February 2020, the on ramp from northbound on Port Wakefield Road was permanently closed. Three weeks later, the Northern Connector project was opened, continuing the freeway south from the Northern Expressway as the North–South Motorway.

Exit list

See also

 Freeways in Australia
 Freeways in South Australia

References

</

Highways in Australia
Roads in Adelaide
Freeways and highways in Adelaide